Coper is a town and municipality in the Colombian Department of Boyacá, part of the subregion of the Western Boyacá Province.

Climate
Coper has a tropical rainforest climate (Af) with heavy to very heavy rainfall year-round.

Born in Coper  
 Winner Anacona, professional cyclist

References

External links 

Municipalities of Boyacá Department